Notogramma is a genus of picture-winged flies in the family Ulidiidae.

Species
 Notogramma azapae
 Notogramma cactipeodes
 Notogramma cimiciforme
 Notogramma cimiciformis
 Notogramma purpuratum

References

Ulidiidae
Tephritoidea genera